Priorstown is a small townland in County Tipperary, Ireland. It is four miles to the east of Clonmel on the N76 road.

References

Townlands of County Tipperary